The year 1954 in architecture involved some significant events.

Events
June 29 – Buckminster Fuller patents his geodesic dome design, later expressed in his Dymaxion House
November – Postwar United Kingdom government limitations on housebuilding are lifted

Buildings and structures

Buildings opened
April – Bevin Court public housing in the London borough of Finsbury, designed by Berthold Lubetkin with Francis Skinner and Douglas Carr 
Autumn – Inauguration of the city district of Vällingby, in Stockholm, Sweden, planned by Sven Markelius
date unknown
Ciudad Universitaria (University City), UNAM's main campus in Mexico City, designed by Mario Pani and Enrique del Moral
Pruitt–Igoe housing project in St. Louis, Missouri, designed by Minoru Yamasaki, first occupied

Buildings completed

date unknown
Hunstanton Secondary Modern School, Hunstanton, Norfolk, England, designed by Peter and Alison Smithson, is completed
St Mary and St Joseph Roman Catholic Church on the Lansbury Estate in Poplar, East London, designed by Adrian Gilbert Scott, is completed
Goddard House, 22 Avenue Road, Stoneygate, Leicester, England, designed by Fello Atkinson and Brenda Walker of James Cubitt & Partners
Martin's (private house), Toys Hill, Brasted, Kent, England, designed by Powell and Moya, is completed

Awards
 Prix de Rome, architecture – Michel Marot.
 Rome Prize Fellowship at American Academy in Rome – Robert Venturi.
 RIBA Royal Gold Medal – Arthur George Stephenson.

Births
February 22 – Jean-Philippe Vassal, French architect
June 23 – Carme Pinós, Spanish architect
October 12 – Keith Griffiths, Welsh-born architect
January 6 – Hans Robert Hiegel, German architect
date unknown – Kengo Kuma, Japanese architect

Deaths
February 25 – Auguste Perret, French architect, pioneer of reinforced concrete (born 1874)
March 28 – Kaare Klint, Danish architect and furniture designer (born 1888)
December 12 – Alker Tripp, English town planner (born 1883)
date unknown – Salvador Valeri i Pupurull, Catalan architect (born 1873)

References